The Maharaja Yeshwantrao Hospital, also known as Maharaja Yashwant Rao Hospital or simply M. Y. Hospital, is a government hospital located in the heart of city of Indore, India.It is the tertiary teaching hospital of one of the oldest government medical colleges in India, MGM Medical College, Indore.

Facilities

M. Y. Hospital has 1300 beds with all the major medical departments: surgery, medicine, obstetrics & gynaecology, dermatology, chest&tb, orthopaedics, E.N.T., ophthalmology, radiology, anaesthesiology, paediatrics, forensic medicine, and casualty and superspeciality departments. Hospital has 25 bedded medical intensive care unit, 15 hemodialysis machine, endoscopy unit, ventilators etc. There are SICU, NICU, PICU, burns units and surgical superspeciality units in M Y hospital.
This seven storied government hospital is surrounded by a group of 6 hospitals in MYH campus namely 200 bedded Chacha Nehru Children's hospitals, 100 bedded M.R. TB hospital, 100 bedded cancer hospital,600 bedded Superspeciality hospital and 500 bedded MTH Women's hospital. The old KEM school is also situated in this campus. It also has a 100 bedded mental hospital associated with it which is located in Badganga, Indore. 
The total number of beds in the hospitals associated with MGM Medical College is about 2900.

History

Indore was once the centre of health care in western India. Central India's first medical institution, King Edward Medical School was established here as early as 1878 & Indore charitable hospital was started in the year 1847. The hospital is named after Yashwantrao Holkar, Maharaja of Indore, the last Holkar ruler. When it was inaugurated in 1955, it was Asia's largest government hospital & largest government hospital till date in CENTRAL INDIA.
It is the first government hospital to be computerised. The first dean of the college was Dr. Bose, Who was also the head of department of pharmacology.

References
Indore

External links
Info on India Hospital Directory
Best Cancer Surgeon in Indore

Hospital buildings completed in 1955
Hospitals established in 1955
Hospitals in Madhya Pradesh
Buildings and structures in Indore
1955 establishments in India
20th-century architecture in India